Böda is a village (småort) in Böda socken, Borgholm Municipality, on the island of Öland, Sweden. Close to the Baltic Sea and giving access to sandy beaches, it is a popular tourist destination.

Böda comprises several villages and small towns, including Kyrketorp with Böda church, Bödahamn (Böda harbor, at the southern end of Bödabukten, a bay), and Mellböda (which has a youth hostel). Bödahamn has a fishing port and marina as well as a sea rescue station. North and west of Böda is the state-owned Böda kronopark. Several camp sites are located near the white, sandy beach of Böda Sand on the Baltic sea, "one of the island's best sandy beaches".

Population
1960: 227
1960: 213
1990: 144
1995: 120
2000: 101
2005: 100
2010: 109

References

External links

Öland
Populated places in Borgholm Municipality